Kamptosomatidae is a family of echinoderms belonging to the order Echinothurioida.

Genera:
 Kamptosoma Mortensen, 1903

References

Echinothurioida
Echinoderm families